Canada competed at the 1932 Summer Olympics in Los Angeles, United States. Despite the games being held during the Great Depression, Canada sent its second largest team to date. 102 competitors, 85 men and 17 women, took part in 69 events in 10 sports.

Canadian Olympic Committee member W. A. Fry self-published a book covering Canadian achievements at the 1932 Winter Olympics and 1932 Summer Olympics. His 1933 book, Canada at the tenth Olympiad, 1932 : Lake Placid, New York, Feb. 4 to 13 - Los Angeles, California, July 30 to Aug. 14, was printed by the Dunnville Chronicle presses and dedicated to Canadian sportsperson Francis Nelson who died in 1932.

Medalists

Gold
 Duncan McNaughton – Athletics, men's high jump
 Horace Gwynne – Boxing, men's bantamweight

Silver
 Alex Wilson – Athletics, men's 800 m
 Hilda Strike – Athletics, women's 100 m
 Mildred Fizzell, Lillian Palmer, Mary Frizzel and Hilda Strike – Athletics, women's 4 × 100 m relay
 Ernest Cribb, Harry Jones, Peter Gordon, Hubert Wallace, Ronald Maitland, and George Gyles – Sailing, 8 m class
 Daniel MacDonald – Wrestling, men's welterweight (66–72 kg)

Bronze
 Phil Edwards – Athletics, men's 800 m
 Phil Edwards – Athletics, men's 1500 m
 Alex Wilson – Athletics, men's 400 m
 Raymond Lewis, James Ball, Phil Edwards, and Alex Wilson – Athletics, men's 4 × 400 m relay
 Eva Dawes – Athletics, women's high jump
 Charles E. Pratt and Noel De Mille – Rowing, men's double sculls
 Earl Eastwood, Joseph Harris, Stanley Stanyar, Harry Fry, Cedric Liddell, William Thoburn, Don Boal, Albert Taylor, and Les MacDonald – Rowing, men's eights with coxswain
 Philip Rogers, Gerald Wilson, Gardner Boultbee, and Kenneth Glass – Sailing, 6 m class

Athletics

Boxing

Cycling

Seven cyclists, all men, represented Canada in 1932.

Individual road race
 Glen Robbins
 James Jackson
 Frank Elliott
 Ernie Gates

Team road race
 Glen Robbins
 James Jackson
 Frank Elliott
 Ernie Gates

Sprint
 Leo Marchiori

Time trial
 Lew Rush

Team pursuit
 Lew Rush
 Glen Robbins
 Russ Hunt
 Frank Elliott

Diving

Fencing

Five fencers, four men and a woman, represented Canada in 1932.

Men's foil
 Ernest Dalton
 Bertram Markus

Men's épée
 Patrick Farrell
 Ernest Dalton
 Bertram Markus

Men's team épée
 Ernest Dalton, Bertram Markus, Patrick Farrell, Henri Delcellier

Men's sabre
 Patrick Farrell

Women's foil
 Joan Archibald

Rowing

Sailing

Swimming

Wrestling

Art competitions

References

Nations at the 1932 Summer Olympics
1932
Summer Olympics